National Youth and Children's Palace, sometimes referred as Pioneer Palace, National Palace or by its original name – Viceroy's Palace, is a historical building located on Rustaveli Avenue in Tbilisi, Georgia.

The history of the building dates back to 1802, when the establishment of the Russian government in Georgia was followed by the appointment of a Commander-in-Chief of the Caucasus in Tiflis. A small building was built for him in 1802. However, in 1807 the building was demolished and replaced with a new one. It was an example of Russian classicism, the most grandiose building in Tbilisi at the time, which was also considered a kind of symbol of the government at the time.
After that the palace was rebuilt several times. In 1818 it was demolished and a new building was designed by architect Brownmiller. With this change, the original administration house became the real palace-residence of the Commander-in-Chief.
Fron 1845 to 1847, the architect Semyonov, invited from Russia, thoroughly changed the look of this whole palace and, in fact, built an interesting and unique building in the style of Classicism. At the same time, the palace garden and a fountain was built.

In 1865, Otto Jakob Simonson, a Swedish architect working in Tbilisi, began a thorough reconstruction of the building and completed it in four years. In 1869, the Viceroy's palace took its final form - as it is today. Simonson significantly increased the palace built by Semyonov and gave it a new look.

During the various periods of Russian Imperial rule in Georgia, the palace was sometimes the residence and palace of the Commander-in-Chief of the Caucasus, and sometimes of the Viceroy

In 1917, the palace housed the government of the Transcaucasian Democratic Federative Republic. On May 26, 1918, the dissolution of the federation was announced in this palace. The National Council of Georgia, convened at the palace on the same day, declared Georgia's independence at 5:10 p.m. Two days later, the independence of the Democratic Republic of Azerbaijan was declared in the same palace. After that, the Government of the Democratic Republic of Georgia housed in the palace. At the same time, the palace was first the seat of the National Council and then of the Constituent Assembly of Georgia. On February 21, 1921, the Constituent Assembly of Georgia adopted the Constitution of the Democratic Republic in this very palace.

After the sovietization of Georgia, the palace first housed the Georgian Revolutionary Committee, then the governments of the Transcaucasian Socialist Federative Soviet Republic and Soviet Georgia. In 1937 the palace was handed over to children. On April 2, 1941, the palace was opened for children.

History

History of the territory

According to the 1735 plan of Tbilisi drawn up by Vakhushti, the Digomi Road passed through the present-day Rustaveli Avenue, which started at the gate of the city wall. To the east of this road, on the slope, Vakhushti has mentioned the inhabited district, "Garetubani", which extended to the present Rustaveli Avenue, Freedom Square, Orbeliani Square and Tchanturia Street. This area, cultivated with the gardens and vineyards was left behind the castle walls of Tiflis. That is why the place was called Garetubani[Peripheries].

Early buildings
The history of the building dates back to 1802. As the Russian authority was established in Georgia, it was accompanied by appointment of Karl Knoring as the Commander-in-Chief of the Caucasus. Commander-in-Chief required a building where the he would work and live.
In the same year, an extensive garden of the outskirts, which belonged to the Georgian Royal Family was selected as a site for the construction of the Karl Knorring Residence. According to the survived sources, the place was promptly constructed by Georgian architects, under the guidance of military engineers. The extensive Administrative building, with the inscription "Правительственные места" [Governing place]is readable on the 1802 Tbilisi plan. 5 years later this palace was demolished and substituted with the new one. This was an example of Russian classicism and carried a symbolic significance of the new power. Later this building was several times remodeled.

Contemporary building

Construction
The second building was demolished in 1818 and the new one was built according to the architect Braunmiller. Later the building was enlarged and the small rooms were substituted by the larger ones, private apartments of the emissary, studies, a pool-room, rooms for clerks, Winter Garden, etc. Initial administrative house was changed to the residence of the Commander-in-Chief.

First renovation
In 1844, when the Russian authority introduced the position of the Viceroy, with Mikhail Vorontsov assigned to it, the palace no more satisfied ambitions of the Russian Czar's aggressive and imperialistic whims. The more noble he was, the brighter the palace had to be. Therefore, they commissioned architect Nikoloz Semionov who was a prominent person in Petersburg. During 1845-47 he drastically changed the outlook of the palace and actually he built an interesting and unique building in the style of classicism. As he changed the building, it acquired more attributes of classicism and there are some features proving it. Some sculptures of Hercules and Minerva emerged in the building and they indicated to the power and wisdom of the new government. A new garden and the water basin with fountains were built during those years. This park as a whole was referred as the “Palace Garden” and only the narrow group of the elite was admitted.

Second renovation
By the end of 1850 there was a strong desire to erect a new, even greater building for the Viceroy on the Gunib Square, where the present Parliament building stands, but realization of the project failed and they decided to remodel the old one. In 1865 the Swedish architect Otto Jacob Simonsson started to reconstruct the palace. 
Otto Jakob Simonson lived in Tbilisi since 1858. He was invited from St. Petersburg, where he had been studying since 1854. After becoming the senior architect
of Tbilisi, he developed a number of projects, including the one of Alexander's Garden (now known as "9th of April" park) and the reconstruction of the First Classical Gymnasium. Simonson started a thorough reconstruction of the palace with the minor alterations and completed in 1865–69, with the exact final shape it has today.

As for the palace, the contribution of Simonson is confirmed in scientific journals and researches. They note that the architect has significantly expanded the old residence of the Viceroy, moved its side wings forward, while the main facade was changed slightly. On the main floor, the central reception hall was altered and enlarged. In the North, he arranged a large foyer, including the festive staircase, a large dining room with a portico and a salon. While in the South, a working office of the Viceroy was located along with a reception and a living room, as well as an exhibition hall, with a terrace and a wide, open staircase to the garden. A bedroom and a boudoir of the Viceroy were overlooking the garden from the middle part of the building. He also added some supporting and entertainment rooms. The facade, typical to classicism, was treated by the Renaissance motifs, the walls were processed with stonework technique and beautified with Musharabi panels. The large dining room was designed in the Persian style, its walls encrusted and curved with ornamental mirrors. According to Simonson's ordinance, the ceiling was adorned with the stalactite niche just like in the working office, windows were filled with the colorful glass, the gilded chandeliers were hung in the hall, the living room, reception, foyer and the lobby were "decorated" with the black and colorful marble chimneys. The more festive look was given to the South facade, directed to the garden.
Therefore, the XIX century Tbilisi acquired a public building distinctive with its high artistic value, given even more distinctive expression by the unique garden.

Russian Revolution and Georgian independence

As the Russian Empire dissolved during the 1917 February Revolution and a provisional government took over, a similar body, called the Special Transcaucasian Committee (Ozakom), did the same in the Caucasus. After the October Revolution and rise of the Bolsheviks in Russia, the Transcaucasian Commissariat replaced the Ozakom. In March 1918, as the First World War continued, the Commissariat initiated peace talks with the Ottoman Empire, which had invaded the region, but that broke down quickly as the Ottomans refused to accept the authority of the Commissariat. The Treaty of Brest-Litovsk, which ended Russia's involvement in the war, conceded parts of the Transcaucasus to the Ottoman Empire, which pursued its invasion to take control of the territory. Faced with this imminent threat, on 22 April 1918 the Commissariat dissolved itself and established the TDFR as an independent state. A legislature, the Seim, was formed to direct negotiations with the Ottoman Empire, which had immediately recognized the state.

Both of these institutions have chosen this building,located on Rustaveli Avenue, as their place of work. 

On May 24, 1918, a meeting of the executive committee of the National Council, chaired by Noe Jordania, was held at Freylin Street, in the residence of the National Council. The session opened on May 24, at 11 p.m. Jordania introduced the content of the letter sent by Akaki Chkhenkeli from Batumi, where he demanded to accelerate the declaration of independence of Georgia. The Transcaucasian Seim was to convene at 10 pm on May 25 to declare the breakup of the Transcaucasian Republic. Later, at the request of the Armenian and Azerbaijani deputies of the Seim, the sitting was postponed to 12 P.M. on 26 May. Noe Jordania proposed that they declare Georgia independent after the Seim declared the breakup of the Transcaucasian Federation. For technical reasons, the council members eventually agreed to Jordania's proposal.

On May 26, 1918, the last sitting of the Transcaucasian Seim was held in the White Hall of the former residence of the Caucasus Viceroy on Golovin Avenue (now Rustaveli Avenue), declaring the Transcaucasian Democratic Federal Republic dissolved at 3 p.m. In the same hall, at 4:50 pm, a session of the Georgian National Council chaired by Noe Jordania was opened. It was attended by 42 members and 36 candidates. Noe Jordania delivered a speech and read the "Georgian Independence Act". The National Council unanimously approved the Independence Act, which approved the number of ministries and the composition of the government.

Two days later, on May 28, 1918, in the same hall of the same palace, the National Assembly of Azerbaijan declared the independence of the Democratic Republic of Azerbaijan and adopted the Act of Independence.

The National Council of Georgia and the Government of the Democratic Republic worked in this palace for a year.

In March 1919, elections to the Constituent Assembly were held in Georgia, in which 60% of the electorate participated. The Constituent Assembly replaced the National Council and approved the legal force of the Act of Independence of Georgia of May 26, 1918. After the elections, the Constituent Assembly of Georgia continued to work in this very palace. After the victory of the Social Democratic Party in the elections, the government was formed only by this party. The Assembly established a Constitutional Commission, which submitted the draft Constitution of the Democratic Republic of Georgia to the Assembly.

Due to various technical reasons, both the drafting of the Constitution and its discussion were delayed.
Finally, in February 1921, after the Russian Red Army invaded Georgia, the Constituent Assembly of Georgia was forced to adopt the Constitution in an expedited manner. On February 21, 1921, an extraordinary meeting of the congregation was convened in one of the halls of the palace. At this sitting, the Constituent Assembly unanimously adopted the Constitution of the Democratic Republic of Georgia.

Soviet rule

Children's Palace

Fourth renovation (2021-present)

Interior

The origin of the building traces its roots to the annexation of Georgia in 1801 by the Russian Empire. The palace was constructed in place of an earlier structure built for the Imperial High-Commissioner Pavel Tsitsianov, himself of Georgian origin, who was assigned to govern the newly annexed lands. The current edifice was built in the mid-19th century and has since been expanded, rebuilt and remodeled several times to accommodate the needs of later Viceroys, who were of increasingly high rank and stature, such as the Emperor's own son.

In 1918, in the midst of the dissolution of the Russian Empire, the building housed the local government, the Transcaucasian Seim. On 26 May, of 1918, while the government was meeting, the Georgian representatives left the palace and, in the White Hall adjacent to the building, declared the creation of the First Georgian Republic.

In 1921, the Red Army invaded Georgia. The government of Soviet Georgia occupied the building until 1937, when it was decided to gift the building to the area's children.

On May 2, 1941, the Palace officially opened its doors for children.  Today, there are 13 cabinets, 6 studios and 1 workshop in the Palace. In total about 550 hobby groups operate in which about 7,000 pupils are enrolled.

See also
Likani Palace
Palace of Mukhrani
Dadiani Palace

References

Works cited

External links
 official website

Palaces in Georgia (country)
Buildings and structures in Tbilisi
Buildings and structures completed in 1818
1941 establishments in Georgia (country)
Education in Tbilisi
1818 establishments in the Russian Empire
Democratic Republic of Georgia
Azerbaijan Democratic Republic